The France women's cricket team toured Germany in July 2021 to play a five-match bilateral Women's Twenty20 International (WT20I) series. It was the first time that the two teams played against each other in official WT20I matches, and the first home series for Germany. The matches were played at the Bayer Uerdingen Cricket Ground in the city of Krefeld. Both teams used the series as preparation for the T20 World Cup Europe Qualifier in August 2021. Germany Women won the series 5–0, with German captain Anuradha Doddaballapur named as player of the series. The result extended Germany's winning streak to 14 consecutive WT20I victories.

Squads

WT20I series

1st WT20I

2nd WT20I

3rd WT20I

4th WT20I

5th WT20I

References

External links
 Series home at ESPN Cricinfo

Cricket in Germany
Cricket in France
Associate international cricket competitions in 2021